"Believe" is a song by American rapper Meek Mill featuring American singer Justin Timberlake. It was released for digital download and streaming on February 7, 2020, through Atlantic. It was attended as the lead single for the former's fifth studio album Expensive Pain.

Background
Meek Mill teased the song on social media on February 5, 2020. He then posted the cover of the song the next day and revealed the release date. He posted the making of the song and sneak peek clips of the music video. Justin Timberlake posted only the making of the song and a picture with Meek Mill and a camera pointing at them. It was released with a music video directed by Maxime Quoilin on February 7, 2020.

Release and promotion
On February 7, 2020, "Believe" was released for digital download and streaming through Meek Mill's label Atlantic.

Credits and personnel
Credits adapted from Tidal.

 Meek Mill – lead vocals, songwriting
 Justin Timberlake – featured vocals, songwriting, production
Rob Knox – songwriting, production
 Benjamin Johnson, songwriting

Charts

Release history

References

2020 singles
2020 songs
Meek Mill songs
Justin Timberlake songs
Songs written by Meek Mill
Songs written by Justin Timberlake
Songs written by Rob Knox (producer)

Pop-rap songs
Song recordings produced by Justin Timberlake